Jacqueline "Jackie" Gunn (born 23 May 1977) is a British bobsledder who has competed since 1999. She won a silver medal in the two-woman event at the 2005 FIBT World Championships in Calgary.

Competing in two Winter Olympics, Davies earned her best finish of ninth in the two-woman event at Turin in 2006.

When not competing in bobsleigh, Gunn is a corporal signals technician in the Royal Air Force.

Davies married in late 2008.

References
 Jackie Davies at the British Olympic Association
 
 
 
 The Sunday Independent (UK) 19 February 2006 featuring Davies and Nicole Minichiello.
 2002 bobsleigh two-women results
 2006 bobsleigh two-woman results
 Bobsleigh two-woman world championship medalists since 2000

1977 births
Living people
British female bobsledders
Bobsledders at the 2002 Winter Olympics
Bobsledders at the 2006 Winter Olympics
Olympic bobsledders of Great Britain
English female bobsledders